The 1990–91 FIS Ski Jumping World Cup was the 12th World Cup season in ski jumping and the 1st official World Cup season in ski flying. It began in Lake Placid, United States on 1 December 1990 and finished in Štrbské Pleso, Czechoslovakia on 21 March 1991. The individual World Cup was won by Andreas Felder and Nations Cup by Austria.

Map of world cup hosts 
All 16 locations which have been hosting world cup events for men this season. Events in Oberwiesenthal and Courchevel were completely canceled.

 Four Hills Tournament

Calendar

Men

Standings

Overall

Ski Flying

Nations Cup

Four Hills Tournament

References 

World cup
World cup
FIS Ski Jumping World Cup